Fairbank is a surname. Notable people with the surname include:

Alfred John Fairbank (1895-1982), British calligrapher, type-designer
Calvin Fairbank (1816-1898), American abolitionist
Christopher Fairbank (born 1953), British actor
Herbert S. Fairbank, American engineer
Janet Fairbank (1903-1947), American operatic singer
Janet Ayer Fairbank (1878-1951), American author
John K. Fairbank (1907-1991), American; historian of  China at Harvard U
N. K. Fairbank (1829-1903), American businessman
Richard Fairbank, American founder and CEO of Capital One
Samuel B. Fairbank (1822–1898), American evangelist and naturalist in India
Valerie Baker Fairbank (born 1949), American judge
William M. Fairbank (1917–1989), American physicist

See also
Fairbanks (surname)
Fairbanks family